Simge Selçuk (born 28 January 1975) is a Turkish actress.

Life and career 
Selçuk was born 27 January 1975 in Ankara. She is a graduate of Bilkent University with a degree in music and performing arts. She made her television debut with a role in the TV series Ferhunde Hanımlar in 1993. She rose to prominence in 2004, with her role as Leyla in the series Aliye. She continued her career with roles in various television series, including Kalbimdeki Deniz, Avrupa Avrupa, and Acemi Cadı. In 2021, she was cast in a leading role in the drama series Kardeşlerim.

Filmography 

 1993, 1999 – Ferhunde Hanımlar – (Yonca)
 1995 – Çiçek Taksi
 1996 – Gurbetçiler – (Özlem)
 1999–2003 – Ayrılsak da Beraberiz – (Serpil)
 2000–2001 – Tatlı Kaçıklar – (Serap)
 2000 – Evdeki Hesap
 2000 – Evdeki Yabancı – (Bengü)
 2001 – Dünya Varmış – (Leyla)
 2002 – Bir Tatlı Huzur
 2004 – Aliye – (Leyla)
 2004 – Metro Palas – (Özlem)
 2004 – Çınaraltı – (Feyza)
 2006 – Acemi Cadı – (Selda)
 2007 – Ayda – (Nilüfer)
 2007 – Elveda Derken – (Tuna)
 2007 – Kader – (Sibel)
 2008–2010 – Küçük Kadınlar – (Tezer Deviren)
 2011–2012 – Avrupa Avrupa – (Mademoiselle Kathrine)
 2011 – Mazi Kalbimde Yaradır – (Türkan)
 2012 – Göç – (Handan)
 2014 – Galip Derviş – (Meltem Ökse)
 2014 – Güzel Köylü – (Nihal Sümbül / Aynımah Dinler)
 2015 – Göç Zamanı – (Handan)
 2016–2017 – Kalbimdeki Deniz – (Rachel)
 2019 – Canevim – (Melis Korkmaz)
 2020 – Zümrüdüanka – (Nezaket)
 2021–present – Kardeşlerim – (Nebahat Atakul)

References

External links 
 
 

1975 births
Turkish television actresses
21st-century Turkish actresses
Actresses from Ankara
Living people